Carin Hernskog   (born 1963) is a Swedish freestyle skier. 

She won a silver medal in aerials at the FIS Freestyle World Ski Championships 1986 in Tignes.

She took part in the 1988 Winter Olympics in Calgary, placing third in aerials, which was a demonstration event at the games.

References

External links 
 

1963 births
Living people
Swedish female freestyle skiers